Rat Rock is an outcrop of Manhattan schist between 600 and 604 West 114th Street in the Morningside Heights neighborhood of Manhattan, New York City. It was named Rat Rock for the large number of rats nesting in it, similar to the other Rat Rock in Central Park. The row houses around it were built in the 1890s, when land in Manhattan was significantly less valuable. Though the land on which it sits has greatly appreciated in value, Columbia University, which owns Rat Rock along with most of West 114th Street, has no plans to remove it, as it has been estimated that removing the rock could cost hundreds of thousands of dollars. The fence around it was placed by the university in order to prevent vandalism. Columbia professor Andrew Dolkart described it as "an extraordinary survivor" of New York City's development, because it "hints at the geology of the city", and The New York Times labelled it one of New York's "most amazing natural wonders".

References 

Columbia University campus
Stones
Morningside Heights, Manhattan